Dingtone is a US based telecommunications and VoIP app, which has features of voice and text messaging, conference calling, Fax and second phone number.

Launched in 2012, the app has over 100 million users. It is available for IOS and Android devices, in over 200 countries.

Overview 
Dingtone is a proprietary app, based on freeware model, used to make phone calls, send text messages, share multi-media content, set up conference calls (up to 1000 people), send and receive fax messages, and leaving voicemails to anyone, for free or at low rates. It provides a free first phone number and a second paid number registered in US, UK, Canada, Australia, France, Germany, Belgium, Netherlands, Poland. App uses virtual currency for the payments, Dingtone Credits, which can be purchased or earned by playing built-in games, referring other users and by watching ads. The application doesn't support Videotelephony.

History 
Dingtone was launched in 2012, by Steve Wei of Dingtone Inc. based in San Jose, CA, US. In November 2022, Dingtone announced to integrate RealCall's open APIs, to combat various types of calling and text messaging harassments and frauds. In December 2022, app had more than 100 million users, and calling services available to more than 200 countries.

Availability 
Dingtone is available in over 200 countries, in 30 languages, with over 100 million active users.

Features 
Dingtone app has range of different features, from free calls and text to spam filters and call blocking. 
 Free calls and text messaging
 Conference calls (up to 1000 users)
 Fax messaging
 First and second phone number
 Dingtone Credit, virtual currency used in the app.
 Built-in games

Awards and recognitions 
Dingtone has been reviewed and featured in business and financial newspapers such as Forbes, Nasdaq, Business Insider, and Benzinga; tech publications such as TechCrunch, PC Magazine, Lifewire, Make use of, Android Authority and Gadget Bridge. It also has been featured by different national and international media channels such as, American newspapers like Fox News, Associated Press, Yahoo! News and Miami Herald, in Indian papers including India TV, The Free Press Journal, Businessworld and APN News, Nigerian sites like The Punch, The Guardian, The Sun, Business Day, Nigerian Tribune, Leadership, Independent and New Telegraph, and Khaleej Times from United Arab Emirates.

It has been listed 2nd in Nigeria's Google Play Store best-seller list of social apps and the 39th on the free app list of social category.

References

External links 
 Dingtone official website

Android (operating system) software
IOS software
Instant messaging clients
Cross-platform software
Communication software